Jarred Land (born May 30, 1975) is an American film producer, cinematographer, photographer, and the current president and co-owner of Red Digital Cinema Camera Company and Red Studios Hollywood.

Career 
In 2003, Jarred started the forum DVXuser.com to seek help from professionals about the use of his DVX100 camera. In 2004, he joined forces with Nick Bicanic to form Purposelabs to establish himself in the cinematography industry. On DVXuser.com, he met Jim Jannard, the founder of Red Digital Camera. In 2006, Land introduced REDuser.net because of the rapid increase in the number of users of the RED section and to educate people about the use of a RED camera that was in the process of development at that time. After collaborating on several projects with Jannard, Land took over Red Digital Cinema Camera Company upon the resignation of Jannard in 2013.

He has over 50 patents awarded to his name.

Filmography

References 

Living people
1975 births
Place of birth missing (living people)
American film producers